Coat of arms of New Holland (Dutch Brazil), resulting of the union of the four coats of the main Dutch dominions in Northeastern Brazil: The first quarter represents Pernambuco; the second quarter, on the right, Itamaracá; below, on the left, Paraíba and finally Rio Grande do Norte.

Gallery

See also
 Coat of arms of the Netherlands
 Coat of arms of Brazil

Brazil
Brazilian coats of arms
Dutch Brazil
Dutch Brazil
Dutch Brazil
Dutch Brazil
Dutch Brazil
Dutch Brazil
Dutch Brazil
Dutch Brazil
Dutch Brazil